Edward John McClernand  (December 29, 1848 – February 9, 1926) was a United States Army brigadier general who was a recipient of the Medal of Honor for valor in action near the Bear Paw Mountains, Montana on September 30, 1877. An 1870 graduate of West Point, his career spanned 42 years, as he served in the army until his retirement on December 29, 1912.

Early life and the western frontier
Edward John McClernand was born in Jacksonville, Illinois, on December 29, 1848. He spent his early school years in Jacksonville and Springfield before graduating from West Point in 1870. His first assignment was to Ft. Ellis, Montana with the 2nd U.S. Cavalry in 1870, beginning nearly 30 years in various cavalry assignments primarily in the American West. His actions at Bear Paw Mountain, Montana on September 30, 1877, resulted in his being received the Medal of Honor on November 27, 1894. He returned to the east coast in 1879 as a Tactical Officer at West Point, returning to the frontier with assignments in Montana, California, and Washington starting in 1883.

Medal of Honor citation
Rank and organization: Second Lieutenant, 2d U.S. Cavalry. Place and date: At Bear Paw Mountain, Mont., 30 September 1877. Entered service at: Springfield, Illinois. Birth: Jacksonville, Illinois. Date of issue: 27 November 1894.

Citation:

"Gallantly attacked a band of hostiles and conducted the combat with excellent skill and boldness."

Later career
McClernand fought in the Spanish–American War, serving in the Santiago campaign. He later saw service in the Philippine Insurrection, commanding the 1st Cavalry Regiment. He was promoted to brigadier general shortly before he retired from active service on December 29, 1912. He was recalled to active duty the next day, serving as president of the Cavalry Board until 1914. He lived in Easton, Pennsylvania, where he wrote "With the Indians and the Buffalo in Montana", for the Cavalry Journal in 1925. He died on February 9, 1926, and was buried in Section 3, Lot 1931-SW of Arlington National Cemetery.

Personal life
Edward John McClernand's father was Major General John Alexander McClernand, commander of the XIII Army Corps in the Civil War. His mother was Mrs. Sarah Dunlap McClernand.  He married Ms. Sarah Pomp (1857–1926), who is buried along with him at Arlington.

References

1848 births
1936 deaths
United States Army generals
United States Army Medal of Honor recipients
United States Military Academy alumni
Burials at Arlington National Cemetery
American Indian Wars recipients of the Medal of Honor